Marcel Pelletier (born 26 February 1888; date of death unknown) was a Luxembourgian track and field athlete who competed in the 1912 Summer Olympics. In 1912 he finished 17th in the shot put competition and 33rd in the discus throw event.

References

External links
list of Luxembourgian athletes
Marcel Pelletier's profile at Sports Reference.com

1888 births
Year of death missing
Luxembourgian sportsmen
Olympic athletes of Luxembourg
Athletes (track and field) at the 1912 Summer Olympics
Luxembourgian male shot putters
Luxembourgian male discus throwers